Rough and Ready is a census-designated place in Nevada County, California, United States. It is located west of Grass Valley, California, approximately 62 miles (100 km) from Sacramento. The population was 963 at the 2010 census. It has frequently been noted on lists of unusual place names.

History
The first established settlement in Rough and Ready was made in the fall of 1849 by a mining company from Wisconsin, known as the Rough and Ready Company, during the California Gold Rush. Their leader, Captain A. A. Townsend, named the company after General Zachary Taylor (nicknamed "Old Rough and Ready") who had recently been elected the 12th President of the United States. Captain Townsend had served under Taylor when he commanded the American Forces during the Black Hawk War (1832). California had three towns so named of which this one survives.

The town declared its secession from the Union as The Great Republic of Rough and Ready on 7 April 1850, largely to avoid mining taxes, but voted to rejoin the Union less than three months later on 4 July. The old republic is celebrated annually as a way to attract tourism and as a point of local pride.

The post office at Rough and Ready was established by February 1851; the first postmaster was Marcus Nutting. The ZIP Code is 95975. The community is inside area code 530.

The post office was closed for a time in 1855, again for a time in 1913, and again from 1942 to 1948.

In 1988, the 49er Fire was accidentally started by a homeless and schizophrenic local man near Highway 49. The fire went on to burn well over a hundred homes and more than 33,000 acres in Nevada County, including structures in and around Rough and Ready.

Present day

What little is left of the town is located on the Rough and Ready Highway. It was bypassed by State Route 20 in the mid-1980s.  Among the oldest buildings are the blacksmith shop (1850s), the Odd Fellows Hall (1854) (now Rough and Ready Grange Hall), and the Old Toll House.

The town of Rough and Ready is honored as a California Historical Landmark (#294).

Geography

Demographics
The 2010 United States Census reported that Rough and Ready had a population of 963. The racial makeup of Rough and Ready was 886 (92.0%) White, 3 (0.3%) African American, 6 (0.6%) Native American, 16 (1.7%) Asian, 6 (0.6%) Pacific Islander, 11 (1.1%) from other races, and 35 (3.6%) from two or more races. Hispanic or Latino of any race were 56 persons (5.8%).

The Census reported that 963 people (100% of the population) lived in households, 0 (0%) lived in non-institutionalized group quarters, and 0 (0%) were institutionalized.

There were 428 households, out of which 95 (22.2%) had children under the age of 18 living in them, 203 (47.4%) were opposite-sex married couples living together, 31 (7.2%) had a female householder with no husband present, 28 (6.5%) had a male householder with no wife present. There were 33 (7.7%) unmarried opposite-sex partnerships, and 2 (0.5%) same-sex married couples or partnerships. 132 households (30.8%) were made up of individuals, and 50 (11.7%) had someone living alone who was 65 years of age or older. The average household size was 2.25. There were 262 families (61.2% of all households); the average family size was 2.77.

There were 160 people (16.6%) under the age of 18, 60 people (6.2%) aged 18 to 24, 184 people (19.1%) aged 25 to 44, 385 people (40.0%) aged 45 to 64, and 174 people (18.1%) who were 65 years of age or older. The median age was 49.5 years. For every 100 females, there were 108.0 males. For every 100 females age 18 and over, there were 104.8 males.

The homeowner vacancy rate was 1.2%; the rental vacancy rate was 10.2%. 755 people (78.4% of the population) lived in owner-occupied housing units and 208 people (21.6%) lived in rental housing units.

Politics

In popular culture
The New York City-based music duo The Great Republic of Rough and Ready takes its name from the town.

The television series Death Valley Days told the story of Rough and Ready in two different episodes.<ref>{{cite web|url=https://www.imdb.com/title/tt0556717/?ref_=fn_al_tt_1|title=Rough and Ready on Death Valley Days|date=December 7, 1957|publisher=Internet Movie Database|access-date=June 12, 2017}}</ref>The Ruins of Rough and Ready'', a "comical western" novel by Clark Casey, "reimagines the three months when Rough and Ready was a sovereign republic". The town drunkard falls asleep in a cave and wakes up in an earthquake to find a giant gold boulder, which must be brought to Sacramento while every bandit in California is closing in. The town is defended by 'oddball miners" and "a sheriff who's afraid of guns".

See also
 History of California
 Republic of Indian Stream
California Historical Landmarks in Nevada County

References

External links
 Ghosttowns.com: Rough and Ready
 The California Gold Country, Highway 49 Revisited: Rough and Ready & the Malakoff Diggings
 About Nevada County.com: Rough and Ready

Census-designated places in Nevada County, California
Mining communities of the California Gold Rush
California Historical Landmarks
History of Nevada County, California
Rough and Ready, The Great Republic of
Rough and Ready, The Great Republic of
Separatism in the United States
Populated places established in 1849
1849 establishments in California
Zachary Taylor
Former countries of the United States
Former regions and territories of the United States
States and territories established in 1850
States and territories disestablished in 1850